16 Delphini is a star in the equatorial constellation Delphinus. It has an apparent magnitude of 5.54, making it faintly visible to the naked eye.

16 Del has a companion that was first discovered by John Herschel and was even noted to be a spectroscopic binary. It is now considered to be a single star.

References

Delphinus (constellation)
A-type main-sequence stars
Delphini, 16
199254
103298
8012
BD+12 4501